Gargoyle Turrets is a group of three prominent sandstone buttresses rising to c.  at the top of steep cliffs above Miller Glacier in the northwest Saint Johns Range of Victoria Land. So named by the New Zealand Geographic Board in 2006 because the massive upper sandstone unit has weathered into steep and cavernously sculptured tors which, when seen from below, have the appearance of gargoyle carvings.

References

Mountains of Victoria Land